Arthrochilus irritabilis, commonly known as clubbed elbow orchid, is a flowering plant in the orchid family (Orchidaceae) and is endemic to Queensland. It has up to five leaves and up to thirty light greenish or reddish, insect-like flower with reddish, hair-like glands on its labellum. There is a single record of this species from Papua New Guinea.

Description
Arthrochilus irritabilis is a terrestrial, perennial, deciduous, sympodial herb with an underground tuber which produces daughter tubers on the end of root-like stolons. The lateral sepals and petals all turn downwards towards the ovary. Flowering occurs from November to February.

Taxonomy and naming
Arthrochilus irritabilis was first formally described in 1858 by Ferdinand von Mueller and the description was published in Fragmenta phytographiae Australiae from a specimen collected "from wooded hills near Moreton Bay". The specific epithet (irritabilis) is a Latin word meaning "easily excited".

Distribution and habitat
The clubbed elbow orchid grows in woodland, forest and heath, sometimes forming large colonies. It is widespread and common between Ingham and Brisbane. There is a single record from Papua New Guinea.

Ecology
As with other Arthrochilus orchids, A. irritabilis is pollinated by males thynnid wasps of the genus Arthrothynnus although the species involved is not known. It also reproduces asexually by producing new tubers.

References 

irritabilis
Plants described in 1858
Orchids of Queensland
Taxa named by Ferdinand von Mueller